Xavier Henry Napoleón Leroux (11 October 1863 – 2 February 1919) was a French composer and a teacher at the Paris Conservatory. He was married to the famous soprano Meyrianne Héglon (1867–1942).

Life
Born in Italy at Velletri, 30 km south-east of Rome, Leroux was the son of a French military bandleader. He studied at the Conservatoire de Paris under Jules Massenet and Théodore Dubois, and won the Prix de Rome in 1885 with the cantata Endymion. From 1896 he taught harmony there. Notable students include  Eugène Bigot, Georges Dandelot, Marc Delmas, Roger Désormière, Louis Fourestier, Henri Mulet, Paul Paray, Louis Vuillemin, and Albert Wolff.

Leroux composed various orchestral and choral works, songs, and piano pieces, but he became known above all as a representative of naturalistic French opera. His masterpiece is the opera Le Chemineau, which was staged six times at the Opéra-Comique between 1907 and 1945.

Alfredo Casella dedicated his Symphony No. 1 in B minor, Op. 5 to him in 1905.

Leroux was married to the Brussels-born soprano Marie-Antoinette Willemsen, who appeared under the pseudonym Meyrianne Héglon (1867–1942).

Selected works

Incidental music
The Persians (Aeschylus)
Plutus (Aristophanes)

Operas
Evangéline (Louis de Gramont) (1895)
Astarté (Louis de Gramont) (1901)
La reine Fiammette (1903)
Vénus et Adonis (Louis de Gramont) (1905)
William Ratcliff (Louis de Gramont after Heinrich Heine) (1906)
Le Chemineau (1907)
Théodora (1907)
Le Carillonneur (1913)
La Fille de Figaro (1914)
Les cadeaux de Noël (1915)
1814 (1918)
Nausithoé (1920)
La Plus forte (1924)
L'Ingénu (1931)

Others
Hymne (1914)

References
Don Randel: The Harvard Biographical Dictionary of Music (Cambridge, MA, 1996), p. 499.

External links

 

1863 births
1919 deaths
19th-century French composers
19th-century French male musicians
20th-century French male musicians
Academic staff of the Conservatoire de Paris
Burials at Père Lachaise Cemetery
Conservatoire de Paris alumni
French male classical composers
French music educators
French opera composers
French Romantic composers
Male opera composers
People from Velletri
Prix de Rome for composition